Chrysophyllum manaosense is a tree in the family Sapotaceae, native to tropical South America.

Description
Its red to brown bark is fissured. Fascicles feature up to 15 greenish flowers.

Distribution and habitat
Chrysophyllum manaosense is native to Colombia, Ecuador, Peru, Brazil and Suriname.

References

manaosense
Flora of Colombia
Flora of Ecuador
Flora of Peru
Flora of North Brazil
Flora of Suriname
Plants described in 1964
Taxa named by André Aubréville